The 1940 Pacific hurricane season ran through the summer and fall of 1940. Before the satellite age started in the 1960s, data on east Pacific hurricanes was extremely unreliable. Most east Pacific storms were of no threat to land. During this season, there is a former typhoon that crossed into central north Pacific.

Systems

Hurricane One
Late on June 17, west-northwest of Acapulco and close to the coast of Mexico, an area of thunderstorms formed into a tropical cyclone. The system was very small, and eventually became a hurricane. It headed west-northwest or northwest, and was last detected early on June 18.

Tropical Storm Two
On July 20, a tropical depression was observed southwest of Acapulco. Historical Weather Maps show this depression near 17N 102W. It intensified into a tropical storm on July 21, tracked northwest, and dissipated on July 24. A depression/remnant low was tracked until July 26. The low was last seen near 24N 129W on the 27th.

Tropical Cyclone Three
On July 29, a tropical cyclone was noticed. It traveled west-northwest or northwest, and dissipated sometime after July 30.

Tropical Cyclone Four
South of Acapulco, a tropical cyclone was spotted on August 3. Historical Weather Maps (HWM) show a low on August 2 near 11N 109W. It rapidly tracked to the west-northwest, and was last seen on August 5. The low is carried on HMW until August 9 near 17N 135W. It is possible that this system retained tropical storm-force winds until approximately August 7.

Tropical Cyclone Five
On September 4, a tropical cyclone was reported. It moved westward, and was lost track of on or after September 5.

Hurricane Six
A tropical cyclone was detected on September 22. The next day, it had intensified into a hurricane. By September 24, the hurricane was close to the Revillagigedo Islands. After that, no further observations were reported.

Tropical Cyclone Seven
A tropical cyclone existed well out to sea from October 6 to 11.

Tropical Cyclone Eight
Another tropical cyclone existed from October 26 to 28 off the coast of Central America.

Tropical Cyclone Nine
A tropical cyclone well southwest of Manzanillo was tracked from November 1 to 3. Due to a blocking area of high pressure, it took an unusual southwesterly track.

Other system
Around October 21, a former typhoon that had previously impacted Wake Island crossed into the central north Pacific. It headed eastwards north of Midway Island. It gradually wheeled around to the southwest. It dissipated just east of Midway around October 22.

See also

1940 Atlantic hurricane season
1940 Pacific typhoon season
1940s North Indian Ocean cyclone seasons
 1900–1950 South-West Indian Ocean cyclone seasons
 1940s Australian region cyclone seasons

References

Pacific hurricane seasons
1940s Pacific hurricane seasons